This is a list of equipment currently in service in the Republic of Korea Army.

Small arms

Domestically produced

Imported products

Tanks
*The list includes equipment used by both the ROK Army and ROK Marine Corps.

The ROK Army operates 2,900 tanks .

Armored fighting vehicles
The ROK Army operates 2,700 armored vehicles  (this figure does not include wheeled armored personnel carriers).

Tracked

Wheeled

Engineering vehicles

Logistics and utility vehicles

The RoK Army operates 9,096 civil vehicles ranging from sedans to buses, forklifts, excavators, and graders.

Communication equipment

Radar systems

Optics and night sight systems

Artillery

The ROK Army operates 5,800 artillery pieces and MRLs . (This figure does not include mortars)

Mortars

Field artillery

Self-propelled artillery

Rocket artillery

Air defense
The Republic of Korea Air Force (ROKAF) additionally operates MIM-23 Hawk, MIM-104 Patriot and KM-SAM SAMs.

Anti-tank weapons

Surface-to-surface missile
The Republic of Korea Air Force (ROKAF) operates an additional surface-to- surface missiles. ROKAF has modified U.S.-supplied Nike surface-to-air missiles for a surface-to-surface mission.

Coastal patrol vessel
The Army also operates its own patrol vessels.

Aircraft
Since 1987 the ROK Army has only operated rotary-wing aircraft.

Auxiliary systems

References

Military equipment of South Korea
Republic of Korea Army
South Korea Army
Equipment